The 2004 South Africa rugby union tour of Argentina and Europe was a series of matches played by the Springboks during November and December 2004 in Great Britain, Ireland, and Argentina.

Their goal of obtaining a Grand Slam failed due to losses against Ireland and England. While the Springboks were in the British Isles, the South Africa A team made a three match tour of Argentina.

Matches

Wales
In the first match, South Africa obtained a narrow victory over Wales thanks to a great performance from their goalkicker Percy Montgomery.

Ireland
The dream of obtaining the Grand Slam vanished in the second match. Ronan O' Gara on one side, and Percy Montgomery on the other, were the only scorers for their respective teams. Ireland obtained their first victory against the Springboks in 39 years.

England
England, led by fly-half Charlie Hodgson, beat South Africa for a sixth consecutive time, in the match which featured the debut of Bryan Habana

Scotland
The Springboks defeated Scotland easily in the fourth match of the tour.

Argentina
The last match against the "Pumas" was won by South Africa, with many of Argentina's best players remaining in Europe to play for their clubs.

See also
 2004 end-of-year rugby union tests

References

2004 rugby union tours
2004 in South African rugby union
2004
2004–05 in European rugby union
2004–05 in Welsh rugby union
2004–05 in Irish rugby union
2004–05 in English rugby union
2004–05 in Scottish rugby union
2004 in Argentine rugby union
2004
2004
2004
2004
2004